If You Love Me is the debut studio album released on 2 November 2012 by the Taiwanese singer-songwriter, Eve Ai. This album has been produced for over 1 year, where Metal Girl was Eve's first original soul song.

Track listing

MV
《If You Love Me》 (Directed by Hung-i Chen) 
《Don't Say It》 (Directed by Shawn Yu) 
《Sensitive》 (Directed by Shawn Yu)

Charts

References 

2012 debut albums
Eve Ai albums